Mabel Pines is a fictional character and one of the two lead characters of the Disney Channel animated series Gravity Falls. The character is voiced by Kristen Schaal, and designed by the series creator, Alex Hirsch. She is inspired by Hirsch's own twin sister, Ariel Hirsch. Mabel first appeared on the unreleased, unnamed pilot created by Hirsch which he used to pitch the show; she then appeared on the first episode "Tourist Trapped". Mabel, with her brother Dipper Pines, stars in every episode of the series. Mabel also has two series of shorts dedicated to her: "Mabel's Guide to Life" and "Mabel's Scrapbook", appearing in the shorts "Dipper's Guide to the Unexplained" and "Fixin' it with Soos", and music video "Call Me Maybe Mabel".

Several alternate reality versions of Mabel are featured in Rick and Morty media and Gravity Falls: Lost Legends, in particular Mortabel Pines–Smith, a composite character of Mabel and Morty Smith featured as a recurring character in Lost Legends, the Rick and Morty episodes "Close Rick-counters of the Rick Kind", "The Ricklantis Mixup", and "Rickmurai Jack", and the video game Pocket Mortys, as well as the Anti-Mabel, Mabel's archenemy.

Background
Mabel is an energetic 12-year-old girl (she and her brother turn 13 at the end of the series finale) who is sent with her brother to spend her summer vacation in her great-uncle's tourist trap called the "Mystery Shack". She helps her brother Dipper as he endeavors to uncover the secrets of the fictional town of Gravity Falls and to find an explanation for the strange situations they experience. They are helped by the handyman that works there, Soos, Wendy, Dipper's crush and the twins' best friend/co-worker, and other characters throughout the series. The situations that they encounter include dealing with various supernatural or legendary creatures, like gnomes, cryptids, demons, aliens, minotaurs and the ever nefarious Bill Cipher.

Mabel is both fun and brave, as well as determined in whatever she sets out to do. Like her brother, she struggles with growing up and wants to be seen as more than she is. She is smarter than she often is portrayed and will always look out for her brother, no matter what.

The adventures of Mabel and her brother are inspired by the childhood of series creator Alex Hirsch and his own twin sister. As a character, Mabel has been critically well received. She appears in various Gravity Falls merchandise, such as on clothing, in video games, and in music videos.

Role in Gravity Falls

Mabel Pines is an energetic and optimistic girl from Piedmont, California, forced to spend her summer together with her great uncle Stan in the fictional town of Gravity Falls, Oregon. She is accompanied by her twin brother Dipper Pines. Their parents aren't revealed in the show.

Mabel wears a variety of colorful sweaters and skirts. She is a self-proclaimed arts and crafts master, going so far as to make a wax figure of her uncle Stan with the leftover wax of a melted figure during the episode "Headhunters". She grew to like Grunkle Stan and he likes her, too, and is often protective of her and Dipper.

Mabel is boy-crazy and dislikes anyone who opposes her brother. She has a pet pig named Waddles who she won in the episode "The Time Traveler's Pig". Despite seeming as just being there for comic relief, Mabel is frequently instrumental in helping her brother solve the mysteries of Gravity Falls and played a pivotal role in all three of the fights that the twins have had against the main antagonist, Bill Cipher, to the point that Dipper says that he has no chance of defeating Bill without Mabel's help.

Show and character creator Alex Hirsch has stated on occasions that Mabel is much smarter than she seems, saying in a 2013 Reddit AMA that:
"Mabel's not stupid. She's a ham! There's a big difference. Mabel's love of goofing off is a natural force of her personality, but she can still understand when people she cares about need help or are in danger. Don't just make her a catchphrase machine. She really cares about the people around her. (Secret: Mabel's secretly jealous that her brother's better academically than she is)."

Alternate versions
In the Rick and Morty episode "Close Rick-counters of the Rick Kind" the 2014 penultimate episode of the first season of the American science fiction comedy television series Rick and Morty by Justin Roiland and Dan Harmon, directed by Stephen Sandoval and written by Ryan Ridley, twin boy and girl versions of protagonist Mortimer Chauncey "Morty" Smith, modelled after Dipper and Mabel Pines, are featured in the background of the episode in Easter egg cameo appearances, subsequently named as Mortipper and Mortabel Pines–Smith by Gravity Falls creator Alex Hirsch, and featured as playable characters in the role-playing video game Pocket Mortys. After the duo cameoed again in the third season episode "The Ricklantis Mixup", Mortabel returned on her own in the Gravity Falls: Lost Legends storyline Don't Dimension It by Hirsch and Serina Hernandez, depicted as one of the many alternate versions of Mabel trapped in a pocket dimension, who join the primary reality Mabel in confronting the Anti-Mabel. Mortabel is next seen in Rick C-137's "crybaby" backstory flashback in the fifth season finale "Rickmurai Jack", in which a younger Rick had stolen technology from Mortabel's own grandfather, as she had been exiting their family's garage along with her and Mortipper's sister Summer, and is not present on the Citadel when it is destroyed.

In the graphic novel Gravity Falls: Lost Legends storyline Don't Dimension It by Alex Hirsch and Serina Hernandez, on an expedition through the forests of Gravity Falls to check for any dimensional rifts in the aftermath of "Weirdmageddon 3: Take Back The Falls", Mabel falls into a wormhole when retrieving Waddles, and ends up in a pocket dimension along with other lost Mabels of the Multiverse (including Mortabel). However, as all of the various Mabels are too preoccupied with their own tasks, none are able to help Mabels return back to her dimension, as Grunkles Stan and Ford attempt to track down Mabel through the multiverse. Meanwhile, Mabel meets another Mabel who closely resembles her and shares her determination to leave the dimension. Both work together to retrieve a flare gun and manage to alert the Grunkles to their location. However, the other Mabel locks Mabel into an outhouse, revealing herself to be the Anti-Mabel, an evil version of her, and intends to take over another Mabel's life and her dimension. The Grunkles, unaware of the switch, pick up the Anti-Mabel. Getting out of the outhouse, Mabel tries to get help from the other Mabels but becomes aggravated when they are too preoccupied too help. Coming to realize just how similar to past actions of hers they are like, Mabel manages rallies the other Mabels for help in defeating Anti-Mabel. En-route back to their dimension, the Grunkles are overpowered by the Anti-Mabel, who seeks to conquer the multiverse. Mabel and her alternate versions arrive, fighting against the Anti-Mabel while rescuing Stan and Ford. The Anti-Mabel is overpowered and the Pines ejects her into space. Dropping the Pines off at the rift leading back to their dimension, the other Mabels thank them for their help before returning to their home dimensions. Upon their return, the Grunkles seal the rift and Mabel apologizes to Dipper for her past actions and gives a blue journal with a pine tree on it which she got from Mabipper (a composite version of the siblings) and hopes to start new adventures together.

Behind the scenes
Mabel is based on series' creator Alex Hirsch's own twin sister Ariel Hirsch. Growing up, she had a personality that was close to that of Mabel's, similarly to Alex having one that was like Dipper's. Mabel was voiced by actress Kristen Schaal. Alex has stated in the past that Kristen was always his first choice as the voice of Mabel. She first appeared in the unreleased pilot made for Gravity Falls in 2010 by House of Cool Studios, which Alex Hirsch used to pitch the series to Disney Channel.

References

Child characters in television
Television characters introduced in 2012
Animated human characters
Fictional twins
Fictional characters from San Francisco Bay Area
Fictional characters based on real people
Female characters in animated series
Fictional American Jews
Female characters in television
Gravity Falls characters
Rick and Morty characters
Animated characters introduced in 2012
Animated characters introduced in 2014